The 1929 Southwest Texas State Bobcats football team was an American football team that represented Southwest Texas State Teachers College—now known as Texas State University–as a member of the Texas Intercollegiate Athletic Association (TIAA) during the 1929 college football season. Led by 11th-year head coach Oscar W. Strahan, the Bobcats finished the season with an overall record of 6–1–2 and a conference mark of 4–0–2, winning the TIAA title. The team's captain was Cotton Branum.

Schedule

References

Southwest Texas State
Texas State Bobcats football seasons
Southwest Texas State Bobcats football